Lokaltermin is a German television series.

See also
Beschlossen und verkündet (1975)
List of German television series

External links
 

German crime television series
1973 German television series debuts
1973 German television series endings
German-language television shows
ZDF original programming
German legal television series